This is a list of members of the 45th Legislative Assembly of Queensland from 1986 to 1989, as elected at the 1986 state election held on 1 November 1986.

 On 9 April 1987, the National member for Southport, Doug Jennings, died. National Party candidate Mick Veivers won the resulting by-election on 20 June 1987.
 On 1 December 1987, the National member for Barambah and former Premier, Joh Bjelke-Petersen, resigned. Citizens Electoral Council (CEC) candidate Trevor Perrett won the resulting by-election on 16 April 1988. Perrett subsequently quit the CEC and joined the National Party in December 1988.
 On 24 May 1988, the National member for South Coast, Russ Hinze, resigned following revelations of official corruption at the Fitzgerald Inquiry. National Party candidate Judy Gamin won the resulting by-election on 28 August 1988.
 On 27 September 1988, the Labor member for Manly, Eric Shaw, resigned from the Labor Party following his loss of endorsement to contest the 1989 election. He served out the remainder of his term as an independent.
 On 20 January 1989, the National member for Merthyr, Don Lane, resigned following criminal proceedings resulting from the Fitzgerald Inquiry. Liberal Party candidate Santo Santoro won the resulting by-election on 13 May 1989.
 On 3 June 1989, the member for Isis and Speaker of the Assembly, Lin Powell, left the National Party. He served out the remainder of his term as an independent.
 On 9 November 1989, shortly after the 1989 election had been called, the member for Whitsunday, Geoff Muntz, left the National Party. He served out the remainder of his term as an independent.

See also
1986 Queensland state election
Premiers:
 Joh Bjelke-Petersen (National Party) (1968–1987)
 Mike Ahern (National Party) (1987–1989)
 Russell Cooper (National Party) (1989)

References

 

Members of Queensland parliaments by term
20th-century Australian politicians